Mardi Oakley Medawar is a novelist of Cherokee descent who lives on the Red Cliff Chippewa Reservation.  Her novels mostly centre on Kiowa and Crow tribes, and are usually within the mystery genre.

Novels
 The Ft. Larned Incident (2000). 
 Murder at Medicine Lodge (1999). 
 Remembering the Osage Kid (1999). 
 The Misty Hills Of Home (1998). 
 Witch of the Palo Duro (1997). 
 Death at Rainy Mountain, (1996). 
 People of the Whistling Waters (1993).

Awards
Medicine Pipe Bearer's Award  for Best First Western Novel (Western Writers of America, 1994).
 Prose Fiction Writer of the Year Award (Wordcraft Circle of Native Writers, 1998)

See also
Native American Studies
List of writers from peoples indigenous to the Americas

External links
Interview with American Western magazine  • www.readthewest.com website got hacked/squatted/hijacked way back in 2008

20th-century American novelists
21st-century American novelists
American women novelists
Year of birth missing (living people)
Living people
American people of Cherokee descent
20th-century American women writers
21st-century American women writers